The soundtrack for the 2018 American animated superhero film Spider-Man: Into the Spider-Verse, based on the Miles Morales incarnation of the Marvel Comics character Spider-Man and produced by Sony Pictures Animation, consists of both an original score composed by Daniel Pemberton and a soundtrack featuring original songs written for and inspired by the film. A soundtrack featuring songs made for the film, titled Spider-Man: Into the Spider-Verse (Soundtrack from & Inspired by the Motion Picture) was released by Republic Records on December 14, 2018, the same day as the film's theatrical release, while a separate album featuring Pemberton's score, titled Spider-Man: Into the Spider-Verse (Original Score), was released three days later by Sony Classical Records.

Soundtrack

The soundtrack features songs performed by an array of artists, including XXXTENTACION, Juice WRLD, Vince Staples, Jaden Smith, Nicki Minaj, Lil Wayne, Ski Mask the Slump God, Ty Dolla $ign, Post Malone, Swae Lee, Anuel AA, and Thutmose. The soundtrack was supported by the singles "Sunflower" and "What's Up Danger". It was released by Republic Records on December 14, 2018, the same day as the film's theatrical release. A deluxe version of the soundtrack, with remix versions of "Sunflower" and "Scared of the Dark" as bonus tracks, was released on February 22, 2019.

Background
In November, Nicki Minaj revealed that she had written a song for the film. It was later revealed that the song is titled "Familia" and that it features Anuel AA and Bantu. The soundtrack was curated to represent what a teen like Morales would listen to.

Singles
In October, Post Malone revealed on The Tonight Show Starring Jimmy Fallon that he had written a song for the film titled "Sunflower", which Billboard described as a "funky, dreamy ballad". The song, which is co-performed by Swae Lee, was released on October 18.

A second single, titled "What's Up Danger" and performed by Blackway and Black Caviar, was released on November 1, 2018. Blackway said that "[b]eing presented with the opportunity to be a part of this project is probably the coolest thing that has ever happened to [him]", while Black Caviar claimed that "when the opportunity to write a song for the new Spider-Man: Into the Spider-Verse film came up, [their] 10-year-old selves were freaking out".

Track listing
Credits adapted from Pitchfork and iTunes.

Notes
  indicates an additional producer
  indicates a co-producer
  indicates a vocal producer
  indicates a remixer
 "Way Up" features background vocals by Tyler Cole & OmArr
 "Familia" features background vocals by Pip Kembo
 "Start a Riot" features background vocals by Breyan Isaac
 "Hide" features background vocals by Carl Chaney

Reception

Critical
Aaron Williams of Uproxx said that the soundtrack understands the necessity of representing positively the title character's ethnic group, stating it "services this idea as admirably as the film's titular character does the legacy of his revered namesake", calling it "one of the best hip-hop-oriented film soundtracks ever created". He called "Memories" "the sound of the vibrant culture of the melting pot", something he felt was also present in "Familia" which he called "a reggaeton track that Miles would almost certainly enjoy listening to alongside his streetwise, Puerto Rican mother Rio". He also stated that "[t]he most impressive part is how the compilation hangs together as its own separate body of work".

Commercial
The Spider-Man: Into the Spider-Verse soundtrack debuted at number five on the US Billboard 200 with 52,000 album-equivalent units, including 14,000 in pure album sales. In the week ending January 17, 2019, the soundtrack moved up to number two, the highest it has ever been, mainly due to its lead single "Sunflower" hitting number one on the US Billboard Hot 100.

Charts

Weekly charts

Year-end charts

Decade-end charts

Certifications

Score

In July 2018, Daniel Pemberton was revealed to be scoring Into the Spider-Verse. Pemberton said that "It has been such a pleasure to enter the Spider-Verse with such an amazing array of collaborators and truly ground-breaking directors", and said that "[he felt] so lucky to have been a part of it and to have the opportunity to create a whole new musical universe for one of the world's most beloved superheroes – Spider-Man". Spring Aspers, head of music and creative affairs at Sony Pictures, praised Pemberton's score, calling it "a perfect blend of influences that captures Miles Morales's Brooklyn world and the film's inclusive, optimistic message of heroism: that when it's time to step up, anyone can wear the mask". The score was released in both CD and digital formats, with the digital format featuring additional tracks to the CD version.

Track listing
All music composed by Daniel Pemberton.

A Very Spidey Christmas

Sony Pictures Animation revealed that an extended play album based on a throwaway joke featured in Into the Spider-Verse was set to be released on December 21, 2018. Producer Phil Lord was unaware of Chris Pine's ability to sing prior to recording. The EP, titled A Very Spidey Christmas, features 5 Christmas-based songs performed by cast members Chris Pine, Shameik Moore, Jake Johnson, and Jorma Taccone. The EP features a cover of the song "Jingle Bells" titled "Spidey-Bells (A Hero's Lament)", performed by Pine, which was featured on the film's end credits. A cover of "Deck the Halls" by Johnson is also featured in the EP. Both songs were released as singles on December 20, 2018.

Track listing

References

2018 soundtrack albums
2010s film soundtrack albums
Hip hop soundtracks
Pop soundtracks
Trap music albums
Republic Records soundtracks
Spider-Man film soundtracks
Spider-Verse (franchise)
Albums produced by Louis Bell
Albums produced by Take a Daytrip
Albums produced by Rick Nowels